Ratcheugh Observatory is a late 18th-century folly on a prominent crag between Alnwick and Longhoughton in north Northumberland, England. Commissioned by Hugh Percy, 1st Duke of Northumberland, the castellated Observatory incorporates a viewing tower with prospects of Alnwick and its castle, and of the North Sea coast at Boulmer.

Location

Observatory
The Observatory, a Grade 1 listed building,  is a screen-wall built at the crag edge, incorporated into which are a number of turrets or towers; and having towards its northern extent a square-plan viewing tower built on open hollow-chamfered arches. The tower has a single enclosed room, each wall having three large round-arched windows affording commanding views to the north-east, north-west, south-east and south-west. The structure is described by Historic England as a gazebo and eye-catcher in the Castellated Gothick style, and is constructed in rough-faced stone with ashlar dressings.

The Observatory was designed by (or follows a design outline of) Robert Adam, and dates from 1754–1770.  It provides very fine views of Alnwick Castle, Hulne Park, Hulne Priory and other local possessions of the Duke; a 360° panorama of the local area, farmland used for fox hunting and point-to-point horse racing; and distant views of Dunstanburgh and Warkworth Castles and the Farne Islands.

It is one of a number of follies built on the skylines around Alnwick; others include the 1781 Brizlee Tower, another creation of the Duke; Jenny's Lantern on the Bolton estate, and Crawley Tower on the Shawdon estate, all dating from the late 18th century.

The Observatory incorporates a small cottage, a later c.1850 addition.

Notes

References

Folly buildings in England
Grade I listed buildings in Northumberland
Observation towers in the United Kingdom
Towers completed in the 18th century
Towers in Northumberland
Longhoughton